Wife Tamers is a 1926 American silent short comedy film directed by James W. Horne and produced by Hal Roach. It stars Lionel Barrymore, Clyde Cook, and Gertrude Astor. It was distributed by Pathé Exchange.

Cast
Lionel Barrymore as Mr. Barry
Clyde Cook as The Butler
Gertrude Astor as Mrs. Barry
Vivien Oakland as The Other Woman
James Finlayson as The Waiter
John T. Murray as A Friend

Preservation
Prints of Wife Tamers survive at UCLA Film and Television Archive and Loose Than Loose Publishing.

See also
Lionel Barrymore filmography
Gertrude Astor filmography

References

External links

Lobby title card (archived)
Still of scene (archived)

1926 films
American silent short films
Films directed by James W. Horne
American black-and-white films
1920s American films